Ebaeides is a genus of beetles in the family Cerambycidae, containing the following species:

 Ebaeides albopicta Fisher, 1925
 Ebaeides arcuosus Holzschuh, 1998
 Ebaeides basalis Fisher, 1925
 Ebaeides borneensis Fisher, 1925
 Ebaeides corporaali Breuning, 1951
 Ebaeides dohertyi Breuning, 1969
 Ebaeides exigua Pascoe
 Ebaeides fulva Fisher, 1925
 Ebaeides grouvellei (Belon, 1891)
 Ebaeides hirsuta Fisher, 1925
 Ebaeides monstrosa Pascoe, 1864
 Ebaeides montana Fisher, 1925
 Ebaeides palawanica Breuning & Jong, 1941
 Ebaeides palliata Pascoe, 1864
 Ebaeides perakensis Breuning, 1959
 Ebaeides pilosicornis Fisher, 1925
 Ebaeides rufula Pascoe, 1864
 Ebaeides samarensis Breuning, 1956
 Ebaeides strandiella Breuning, 1940

References

 
Cerambycidae genera